The δ (delta) scale is a non-octave repeating musical scale. It may be regarded as the beta scale's reciprocal, since it is "as far 'down' the (0 3 6 9) circle from α as β is 'up'". As such it would split the minor second (presumably 16:15) into eight equal parts of approximately 14 cents each . This would total approximately 85.7 steps per octave.

The scale step may also precisely be derived from using 50:28 (25:14, 1003.8 cents, A) to approximate the interval , which equals 6:5 (E, 315.64 cents). Thus the step is approximately 13.946 cents, and there are 86.049 steps per octave.

()

The Bohlen–Pierce delta scale is based on the tritave and the 7:5:3 "wide" triad and the 9:7:5 "narrow" triad (rather than the conventional 4:5:6 triad). Notes include:
1:1 
25:21 
9:7 
75:49 
5:3 
9:5 
15:7 
7:3 
25:9 
3:1

See also 
 Alpha scale
 Beta scale
 Gamma scale

References

Further reading 
 Bohlen, Heinz: "13 Tonstufen in der Duodezime", Acustica, vol. 39 no. 2, S. Hirzel Verlag, Stuttgart, 1978, pp. 76–86. 

Equal temperaments
Non–octave-repeating scales